Josef Oster (born 4 January 1971) is a German politician of the Christian Democratic Union (CDU) who has been serving as a member of the Bundestag from the state of Rhineland-Palatinate since 2017.

Political career 
Oster became a member of the Bundestag after the 2017 German federal election, representing the Koblenz district. He is a member of the Committee on Petitions and the Committee on Internal Affairs. In that capacity, he serves as his parliamentary group's rapporteur on foreign deployments of the Federal Police.

In addition to his committee assignments, Oster is part of the Parliamentary Friendship Group for the States of East Africa, which is in charge of maintaining inter-parliamentary relations with Ethiopia, Burundi, Djibouti, Eritrea, Kenya, Rwanda, Somalia, Sudan and Uganda.

References

External links 

  
 Bundestag biography 

1971 births
Living people
Members of the Bundestag for Rhineland-Palatinate
Members of the Bundestag 2021–2025
Members of the Bundestag 2017–2021
Members of the Bundestag for the Christian Democratic Union of Germany